Haninder Dhillon (born 27 October 1976, in India) is a Canadian cricket player. He is a right-handed batsman and right-arm medium pace bowler. He made his debut for Canada on 28 May 2004 in an ICC Intercontinental Cup game against the USA in Florida. He has played five games in that tournament in total. He made his One Day International debut for Canada on 16 May 2006 against Zimbabwe in Trinidad, and has played two ODIs in total. He also represented Canada in the 2004 ICC Americas Championship and the 2005 ICC Trophy.

1976 births
Canada One Day International cricketers
Canadian cricketers
Living people
Canadian people of Indian descent